Reed Zuehlke, born Reed Johann Zuehlke on October 26, 1960 in Eau Claire, Wisconsin., was an athlete from the United States in the ski jumping competition at the 1980 Winter Olympics in Lake Placid and the 1984 Winter Olympics in Sarajevo.

Biography
Zuehlke was the U.S. national champion in 1982 for the normal hill event, his best finish in World Cup Competition was sixth in 1979. Outside of ski jumping, Zuehlke studied business at the University of Wisconsin-Eau Claire and DePaul University. He later worked with United Airlines from 1986–2003 and used to work for JetBlue Airways. He recently was hired by Gladiator Tech.

Olympic results

References

1960 births
Sportspeople from Eau Claire, Wisconsin
Olympic ski jumpers of the United States
Ski jumpers at the 1980 Winter Olympics
Ski jumpers at the 1984 Winter Olympics
American male ski jumpers
University of Wisconsin–Eau Claire alumni
DePaul University alumni
Living people